Colin Fleming and Ken Skupski were the defending champions; however, they didn't start this year.
Unseeded Frederik Nielsen and Joseph Sirianni won in the final 4–6, 6–4, [10–6], against 1st-seeded Sanchai Ratiwatana and Sonchat Ratiwatana.

Seeds

Draw

Draw

References
 Doubles Draw

Challenger Banque Nationale de Granby
Challenger de Granby